Neil Alexander Danns (born 23 November 1982) is a professional footballer who plays as a midfielder for  club Macclesfield and the Guyana national team. In December 2022, Danns was also appointed interim manager at Macclesfield. He began his career in 2000 as a trainee at Blackburn Rovers and subsequently played for Colchester United, Birmingham City, Crystal Palace, Leicester City, Bolton Wanderers and Bury. He became a free agent after Bury were expelled from the Football League, and joined Tranmere Rovers in September 2019 until the end of the 2019–2020 season. He then played in non-league football for Radcliffe, FC Halifax Town, and in the Cymru Premier for Connah's Quay Nomads, before joining Macclesfield.

Club career

Early career
Danns began his football career on schoolboy forms with Liverpool and spent two years at the Football Association's School of Excellence at Lilleshall. At 16, he chose to leave Liverpool, and signed for Blackburn Rovers as a trainee "in the face of fierce competition". He converted his penalty in the shootout by which Blackburn's youth team beat Liverpool's to reach the 2000–01 FA Youth Cup Final, and captained the team in the final, scoring as Blackburn beat Arsenal 3–1 in the second leg having lost the first leg 5–0.

First-team football: Blackburn Rovers and loans
Manager Graeme Souness gave Danns a "surprise" debut on 19 September 2002 in the starting eleven for the 1–1 draw with CSKA Sofia in the UEFA Cup; according to the Lancashire Evening Telegraph, he "didn't let anyone down with a lively performance". He made his first Premier League appearance three days later as a late substitute in a 1–0 win over Leeds United, and went on to make six appearances in all competitions in the 2002–03 season.

Ahead of the 2003–04 season, it was expected that Danns would be loaned out to gain first-team experience, and on 4 August, he joined Second Division club Blackpool for an initial one-month loan period, later extended to three months. He started the opening match of the Second Division season, a 5–0 defeat away to Queens Park Rangers. and was sent off in the next, receiving a second yellow card for timewasting near the end of a 3–2 win over Wycombe Wanderers. His first goal for the club, "[hitting] the roof of the net with a screamer from ", began Blackpool's comeback from 2–0 down to win 3–2 at Oldham Athletic, He was sent off for a second time, again for two yellow cards, against Stockport County on 20 September, and scored his second Blackpool goal in his next league match, "rounding the keeper and striking a sweet left-foot shot into the far corner and between the two defenders on the line" to complete a 2–1 win over Notts County. Despite manager Steve McMahon and the players wanting him and fellow Blackburn loanee Jonathan Douglas to stay, both left Blackpool after their three months.

Danns "ran his heart out" for the 16 minutes of what proved to be his final appearance for Blackburn Rovers in a 4–3 loss against Bolton Wanderers on 10 January 2004. In March, he joined another Second Division club, Hartlepool United, on a one-month loan, later extended to the end of the season, and as he had with Blackpool, he made his debut in a heavy defeat to Queens Park Rangers. He established himself as a regular in the side, scored the winning goal away to Wrexham in April, and helped Hartlepool reach the play-offs. Danns played in both legs of the semi-final, in which they lost 3–2 on aggregate to Bristol City, having been 2–1 ahead with three minutes plus stoppage time to go.

Colchester United
In September 2004, Danns joined League One club Colchester United on loan as injury cover. He started the next match, a 3–1 league win over AFC Bournemouth on 11 September, and scored both goals in a 2–1 defeat of Port Vale on 4 October. The loan was extended for a second month, and Danns was a regular in the first team throughout his 13-match stay, during which he scored four times.

In December, disappointed at a perceived lack of opportunity at his parent club, Danns rejoined Colchester for a nominal fee, later reported as £15,000; his 18-month contract included a 30% sell-on clause. He resumed his place in the team and his goalscoring: his eight goals in this spell included both goals in a 2–1 win away to Stockport County in March 2005, and all 36 of his appearances for the season were in the starting eleven. During a match at Tranmere Rovers in February 2005, the hosts' match video commentator referred to Danns using racially offensive terminology; the commentator was sacked.

Danns scored against Gillingham in the opening fixture of the 2005–06 season, but his team lost 2–1. He missed most of September with an abdominal injury, and took time to return to full fitness, but a run of goals in January, including two against Derby County to take his side through to the FA Cup fifth round, sparked interest from higher-level teams. However, Danns claimed that the progress Colchester were making allowed him to develop without needing to leave13 years later, he expressed his gratitude to the club for giving him the opportunity to shineand that facing Chelsea in a televised FA Cup-tie "could be the start of another big opportunity". He "kept Colchester ticking" as they came close to earning a replay, and played a major part in his team's promotion to the second tier of English football for the first time in their history. His performances were recognised with a place in the PFA League One Team of the Year.

Birmingham City
On 19 June 2006, Danns signed a three-year contract with Birmingham City, newly relegated from the Premier League. The fee was an initial £500,000 with the potential to rise to £850,000. He admitted that he "had a great time at Colchester but when a club the size of Birmingham come in for you, it's hard to say no." He started Birmingham's opening fixtureagainst Colchesterand was involved in the first goal of a 2–1 win. In the first half of the season he was a regular on the pitch, either starting or as a used substitute, and scored three times. He set up a goal for Sebastian Larsson's equaliser against Newcastle United that took the third-round FA Cup-tie to a replay at St James's Park, which Birmingham won 5–1. In the second half of the campaign, he was used increasingly little in league matches, making only one start and five substitute appearances after the turn of the year; bids from League Two club Nottingham Forest to take him either permanently or on loan were rejected. He came back into the squad in early April, but his season ended after being sent off for his part in a mass brawl at the end of Birmingham's defeat at Barnsley; he served a three-match ban and was not selected thereafter as Birmingham won four of the last five matches to confirm their promotion to the Premier League as runners-up.

Danns was determined to establish himself at Birmingham in the 2007–08 season, tried to take consolation from other players who had returned to the squad after lengthy periods out of it, and worked hard on the defensive aspect of the midfield position, but to no avail. He made two substitute appearances in the Premier League and two League Cup starts under manager Steve Bruce and none at all under his successor Alex McLeish, who told him that he should look elsewhere for first-team football.

Crystal Palace
Danns signed a three-and-a-half-year contract with Championship club Crystal Palace on 22 January 2008 for a fee of £600,000, rising to £850,000 conditional on the club's promotion to the Premier League. He made his debut as a 64th-minute substitute in a draw with Southampton on 4 February, and made two starts that month before a groin injury that needed two operations kept him out until 4 October. He returned as a half-time substitute against Nottingham Forest and was involved in Shefki Kuqi's late winning goal. The comeback was short-lived: after two more matches, an ankle injury kept him out for another couple of months, and it took a considerable time to return to full fitness. He finished the season with 23 appearances in all competitions and three goals, which included a header in a 3–1 win away to Plymouth Argyle (a match in which his error led to Argyle's goal) and a much-needed winner against Preston North End in March.

Danns began the 2009–10 season in the starting eleven and largely remained in it. He created goals for others, scored a couple himself, and became increasingly influential as manager Neil Warnock set up the team to play in a style that suited his strengths. Crystal Palace entered administration during the January 2010 transfer window, and the consequent ten-point deduction left the team in danger of relegation. The administrators accepted a bid from Southampton for Danns, but the player rejected the move. Warnock challenged him to "step up and take on the goalscoring duties" from the departed Victor Moses, and he complied, with both goals in a 2–0 win over Peterborough United, a late winner against Scunthorpe United, and two more goals later in the season that took his league tally to eight. However, in the penultimate match of the season, a 1–1 draw with West Bromwich Albion, Danns was sent off for headbutting Graham Dorrans, so was suspended for the visit to Sheffield Wednesday from which Palace needed a point to survive at their hosts' expense. The match was drawn, so Wednesday were relegated. Danns was nominated for Palace's Player of the Year awardaccording to the citation, "his work rate and skill were major reasons Palace stayed up"but lost out to goalkeeper Julián Speroni.

Having served his suspension, Danns scored a late consolation goal against Ipswich Town, and converted a penalty as well as setting up the goal that completed James Vaughan's hat-trick against Portsmouth in mid-September. He made a swift return from medial ligament damage suffered at the end of the month and soon returned to form. With his contract due to expire at the end of the season, speculation grew as to whether he would re-sign: an opinion piece in the local paper in the new year suggested that Danns was one of a small group of players who "aren't putting in 110%" and who should be a priority for new manager Dougie Freedman to get "playing from the same tune", and the player made a lengthy response via social media dismissing any suggestion that he was not giving his all for the club or that his recently acquired back problem was chronic and would make him fail a medical. He returned from injury to make a further 14 appearances, taking his total for the club to 114, in the last of which, having still not signed a new contract, he scored the only goal of the match against Leeds United that all but secured Palace's Championship survival. He was again shortlisted as Palace's Player of the Year, and won the Vice-presidents' Player of the Year award.

Leicester City and loans

Despite Scottish Premier League club Rangers believing themselves close to signing the player, Danns became Sven-Göran Eriksson's second signing for Championship club Leicester City when he agreed terms on a three-year deal to begin on 1 July after the expiry of his Palace contract. He started the opening game of the season, a 1–0 win over Coventry City, and scored his first goal as Leicester eliminated Bury from the League Cup. Danns was a regular inclusion in the matchday squad, both under Eriksson and his successor Nigel Pearson. He scored his first league goal for Leicester against Blackpool in a 2–0 home win in November; his next opened the scoring against his former club Crystal Palace, and he also took the free kick that led to Leicester's second goal in the 2–1 win. He added three more goals in February and March, and in the absence of Richie Wellens, captained the team against Pearson's former club, Hull City, on 24 March. He was sent off after 57 minutes for a "reckless challenge" on Hull's Paul McKenna, and was not selected again for the rest of the season.

At the start of the 2012–13 season, Danns played for 14 minutes in the Championship and made two League Cup appearances, but those were his last before joining Bristol City on 14 November on a month's loan. He made his debut against his former club Blackpool three days later, and in the second match, he set up a goal for Stephen Pearson that helped City end their 11-match winless run with a 3–1 victory at Middlesbrough. His loan was extended for a second month, and he contributed two goals from nine matches before returning to Leicester. Bristol City manager Derek McInnes was keen to extend Danns' stay further, either as another loan or on a permanent basis, but instead he joined another Championship club, Huddersfield Town, on loan until the end of the season.

On his debut, he "certainly put in a shift, first on the right hand side of midfield, then after the departure of [Oliver] Norwood, who started reasonably but lost his way, in the centre", in a draw at home to Birmingham City, He was a regular in the starting eleven as Huddersfield avoided relegation back to League One, with 17 league appearances and 2 goals, the first in a 2–1 West Yorkshire derby defeat of Leeds United and the second in a draw with Peterborough, although a toe injury kept him out of the last three fixtures.

In January 2013, Danns had dismissed suggestions of a disagreement with Nigel Pearson, and professed himself mystified by his exclusion from consideration at Leicester. At the start of the 2013–14 season, Pearson pointed out how fortunate Leicester were to "have quite a lot of quality in terms of our central midfield options", and that Danns would benefit from regular first-team football elsewhere.

Bolton Wanderers
On 26 September 2013, Danns signed on loan for Championship club Bolton Wanderers, managed by Dougie Freedman who had coached him at Crystal Palace. He made his first Wanderers appearance in a goalless draw away to Blackpool on 1 October, and his goal in the next match, away to Birmingham, gave his team their first league win of the season. He soon established himself in the team, and scored four goals from thirteen matches over the three-month spell. Freedman admired his industry, his ability to adapt his style of play to the match situation, and the way "he gets you off your seat and makes things happen", and the player was keen to make the move permanent if Leicester were willing.

He rejoined Bolton on 3 January 2014 on loan until the end of the season. In February and March, he set up a goal in each of three consecutive wins. At the end of April, Danns signed a one-year contract with Bolton, to begin on 1 July after the expiry of his Leicester deal. Highlighting his work-rate, dynamism, and the positive attitude that set an example to the "younger, hungrier players" prioritised by the manager, the Bolton News suggested that "Freedman may have already made the most important signing of the summer".

Amid strong competition for a place in Freedman's preferred 4–2–3–1 formation, Danns started his 2014–15 season from the bench in a 3–0 opening-day loss to Watford. After Mark Davies's stoppage-time penalty kept Bolton in the League Cup first-round match against Bury of League Two, Danns scored twice in extra time to take his side through. He started the next Championship match, and remained in the starting eleven for most of the season. Playing on the right of a diamond formation, Danns scored in new manager Neil Lennon's first home match, a 3–1 win against Brentford on 25 October, before Lennon reverted to the system used by Freedman but with more license given to attack-minded players. In January 2015, Lennon described Danns and Darren Pratley as "pivotal" in the way his team was set up to play. but injury to the latter would adversely affect Danns' form.

At the end of January, Danns signed a one-year contract extension. Having captained the team in the FA Cup third round, he was sent off in the fourth before Bolton let slip a one-goal lead and went out to Liverpool. Soon afterwards, he received his tenth yellow card of the season and with it a two-match ban. In April, Danns and Barry Bannan were "suspended indefinitely" and fined two weeks' wages for drunken behaviour at the club's hotel; after apologising to all concerned, they missed just one match before Lennon recalled them. Danns finished the season with 47 appearances in all competitions.

Danns was considered as stand-in captain after incumbent Pratley was injured, but was not chosen. He scored his first goal of the season on 26 September 2015 in a 2–2 draw with Brighton & Hove Albion during which Jamie Murphy was sent off for fouling him. Accusations of diving prompted Danns to tweet a picture of the damage caused. He played regularly in the first half of the season but in the second, was used off the bench and often out of position. He did not start a league match in 2016 until 9 April, well after Lennon had left the club, in a defeat to Derby County that confirmed Bolton's relegation. Danns was released when his contract expired, having made 81 appearances in his permanent spell.

Bury and loan
After a trial, Danns signed a two–year contract with League One club Bury on 21 July 2016. He scored in the opening game of the season, a 2–0 win over Charlton Athletic, but ten days later injured a foot and was out for a month. He scored his first Bury goal on 18 October from the penalty spot in a 2–1 loss at home to AFC Wimbledon. He was sent off against Bristol Rovers in December for an off-the-ball incident, so served a three-match ban, and spent the second half of the season on loan to League Two club Blackpool.

Danns made his Blackpool debut on 4 February 2017 in a 1–1 draw with Colchester United, but suffered the first hamstring injury of his career the following week and was out for six matches. He played regularly for the rest of the season, and scored in the final match of the regular season, a 3–1 win against Leyton Orient that confirmed Blackpool's play-off place. Danns started in both legs of the semi-final and in the final as Blackpool beat Exeter City to gain promotion to League One.

Ahead of the 2017–18 season, manager Lee Clark told Danns that he could not be guaranteed game time and was free to leave. He was not initially given a squad number and had to train away from the senior squad, but remained keen to be part of Bury's campaign. Despite starting in the EFL Trophy and making three appearances (one start) in the league in September, it was not until Clark was sacked and Ryan Lowe took over as caretaker that Danns returned to the side. Against Gillingham on 11 November, he scored his first Bury goal for a year, but a hamstring injury sustained a week later was to keep him out for the rest of 2017. His exclusion had made him contemplate retirement, but Lowe made him captain and his enthusiasm returned. He scored three goals in February and March, but Bury's return to League Two was confirmed with four matches still to go. Danns signed a one-year contract extension at the end of the season.

Danns retained the captaincy for the 2018–19 season. He scored his first goals on 3 November in a 4–1 win over Macclesfield Town, "smashing home into the top-right corner from the edge of the box" for his second. Lowe said afterwards how pleased he was that Danns' hard work had been rewarded. He found himself in and out of the first team because of injury and his international commitments with Guyana, but still ended up with 34 league appearances (28 starts) as Bury gained promotion back to League One despite the financial turmoil surrounding the club, a winding-up petition pending and players and staff being paid late or not at all.

By the time Danns returned from international duty, Bury's financial position had worsened, and after six fixtures were suspended by the EFL pending credible proof of the club's viability, it was expelled from the league on 27 August 2019. Interviewed on radio station Talksport, Danns was highly critical of the role of the owner, who in his view had "literally destroyed lives" by his failure to progress the club in a proper manner.

Tranmere Rovers
Danns became a free agent after Bury's expulsion from the league, and on 19 September he signed for League One club Tranmere Rovers until the end of the season. He made 24 appearances in all competitions without scoring.

Non-league football
In October 2020, Danns signed for Northern Premier League Premier Division club Radcliffe.

In November 2020, Danns signed a short-term deal with National League club FC Halifax Town. He left the club on 12 January 2021 after appearing in five league games. At the beginning of March, Danns signed for Cymru Premier club Connah's Quay Nomads until the end of the season. He scored once from 16 appearances, the last of which was as a late substitute in the final-day win away to Penybont that confirmed Nomads as 2020–21 Cymru Premier champions.

On 9 September 2021, Danns signed for North West Counties Premier Division club Macclesfield on non-contract terms. On 13 December 2022, Danns was appointed interim manager at Macclesfield.

International career

Danns was called up by Guyana for friendlies against Grenada and Saint Lucia in March 2015. He qualifies for the team via his grandfather. He made his debut against Grenada on 29 March, setting up both goals in a 2–0 victory. After missing the first leg of the 2018 World Cup qualifier against Saint Vincent and the Grenadines because his Guyanese passport did not come through in time, Danns scored twice in the June 2015 second leg, which finished as a 4–4 draw, but his country lost out on away goals.

Danns scored in a 2–2 draw with Barbados in a 2019–20 CONCACAF Nations League qualifier, which doubled as a qualifying tournament for the CONCACAF Gold Cup. He captained the national side and scored their goal in a 2–1 defeat to French Guiana on 20 November that put them out of contention for Gold Cup qualification. However, CONCACAF awarded Guyana a 3–0 win against Barbados, who had fielded ineligible players, which meant that beating Belize in the final qualifier would be enough to see Guyana through to the Gold Cup for the first time in their history. Danns scored the opening goal from the penalty spot, and later missed a second penalty, as Guyana won 2–1.

Danns was named in Guyana's squad for the 2019 CONCACAF Gold Cup, played in all three group matches and scored all three of his country's goals. In the second match, he converted two penalties in a 4–2 loss to Panama that eliminated Guyana from the tournament, and in the third, after "dribbling from the left corner of the 18-yard box, Danns cut inside and curled a right-footer off the underside of the crossbar near the top right corner" in a 1–1 draw with Trinidad and Tobago. He was named in the Group Stage Best XI.

Career statistics

International goals
Scores and results list Guyana's goal tally first.

Personal life

Danns was born in Liverpool, the son of Neil and Karen Danns. Neil senior was a backing singer on the UK's entry in the 1987 Eurovision Song Contest as well as a European title-winning skateboarder. Danns grew up in Toxteth, a difficult neighbourhood, and credited his parents for maintaining discipline and keeping him from involvement in crime. He has three children; the eldest, Jayden, has been a member of the academy at Liverpool F.C., the club which Danns supported as a boy.

In 2010, Danns took a video editing and production course at the London Academy of Media, Film and TV. He was reported to be about to release a single, but did not. His music interests and career were featured in BBC Sport's The Football League Show in February 2010. He is a regular user of Twitter.

Honours

Club
Blackburn Rovers
FA Youth Cup runner-up: 2000–01
Colchester United
Football League One runner-up: 2005–06
Birmingham City
Football League Championship runner-up: 2006–07
Blackpool
EFL League Two play-offs: 2017
Bury
EFL League Two runner-up: 2018–19
Connah's Quay Nomads
Cymru Premier: 2020–21
Macclesfield
North West Counties Football League Premier Division: 2021–22

Individual
PFA Team of the Year: 2005–06 League One

References

External links
Official Website

1982 births
Living people
Footballers from Liverpool
Association football midfielders
Guyanese footballers
Guyana international footballers
English footballers
Blackburn Rovers F.C. players
Blackpool F.C. players
Hartlepool United F.C. players
Colchester United F.C. players
Birmingham City F.C. players
Crystal Palace F.C. players
Leicester City F.C. players
Bristol City F.C. players
Huddersfield Town A.F.C. players
Bolton Wanderers F.C. players
Bury F.C. players
Tranmere Rovers F.C. players
Radcliffe F.C. players
FC Halifax Town players
Connah's Quay Nomads F.C. players
Premier League players
English Football League players
Northern Premier League players
National League (English football) players
Cymru Premier players
2019 CONCACAF Gold Cup players
English people of Guyanese descent
Macclesfield F.C. players
Black British sportsmen
North West Counties Football League players